Vysehrad Independent School District is a public school district located in Lavaca County, Texas (USA).

Vysehrad ISD has one school that serves students in grades Kindergarten though eight.

In 2009, the school district was rated "recognized" by the Texas Education Agency.

References

External links
 

School districts in Lavaca County, Texas